Battle of New York may refer to:

 New York and New Jersey campaign, a series of battles for control of New York City and the state of New Jersey in the American Revolutionary War in 1776 and early 1777
 Saratoga campaign, an attempt by the British high command for North America to gain military control of Hudson River valley during the American Revolutionary War in 1777
 Knicks–Nets rivalry, a rivalry between the New York Knicks and Brooklyn Nets of the National Basketball Association
 Islanders–Rangers rivalry, a rivalry between the New York Islanders and New York Rangers of the National Hockey League
 In the Battle for New York, a novel by H. Irving Hancock
 Battle of New York (Marvel Cinematic Universe), a major battle depicted in the 2012 film The Avengers